RepTar is a repository of cellular targets of host and viral miRNAs.

See also
 MiRTarBase
 MESAdb
 PmiRKB
 microRNA

References

External links
 http://reptar.ekmd.huji.ac.il.

Biological databases
RNA
MicroRNA